V Wars is a 2019 American science fiction horror streaming television series based on the anthology series of the same name and comic book by Jonathan Maberry. The series stars Ian Somerhalder, Adrian Holmes, Jacky Lai, Kyle Breitkopf, Peter Outerbridge, Kimberly-Sue Murray and Sydney Meyer. It premiered on Netflix on December 5, 2019. The series was canceled after one season, in March 2020.

Synopsis
V Wars follows the story of the physician/scientist Dr. Luther Swann, and his best friend Michael Fayne, as they face the evolving crisis of a deadly outbreak that fractures society into opposing factions, potentially escalating to a future war between humans and vampires. The outbreak is caused by an ancient biological infectious agent, a prion, that turns humans into vampires, released from ice by climate change.

In the conflict, the vampire faction, called Blood, is opposed by the elements of the government, such as Calix Niklos (Peter Outerbridge) who plots with anti Blood senator Smythe (Ted Atherton).

Cast and characters

Main 
Ian Somerhalder as Dr. Luther Swann
Adrian Holmes as Michael Fayne
Laura Vandervoort as Mila Dubov 
Kimberly-Sue Murray as Danika Dubov
Sydney Meyer as Ava O'Malley
Michael Greyeyes as Jimmy Saint
Jacky Lai as Kaylee Vo
Kyle Breitkopf as Desmond "Dez" Swann
Peter Outerbridge as Calix Niklos 
Kandyse McClure as Claire O'Hagan

Recurring
Emmanuel Kabongo as Jack Fields 
Jessica Harmon as Jess Swann
Greg Bryk as Bobby 
Teddy Moynihan as Jergen Weber 
Ted Atherton as Elegabulus
Jonathan Higgins as General Aldous May
Samantha Liana Cole as Theresa
Laura de Carteret as Senator Sasha Giroux
Bo Martyn as Detective Elysse Chambers
Nikki Reed as Rachel Swann

Episodes

Production

Development 
On April 16, 2018, it was announced that Netflix had given the production a series order for a first season consisting of ten episodes. The series was created by William Laurin and Glenn Davis, who are credited as the showrunners and executive producers of the series. Additional executive producers were set to include Brad Turner, Eric Birnberg, Thomas Walden, David Ozer, Ted Adams and James Gibb.

Production companies involved with the series include High Park Entertainment and IDW Entertainment. Netflix canceled the series after one season, on March 30, 2020.

Casting 
In April 2018, Ian Somerhalder was cast in the role of Dr. Luther Swann. In June 2018, Adrian Holmes, Jacky Lai and Peter Outerbridge joined the main cast. In July 2018, Laura Vandervoort, Kyle Breitkopf and Kimberly-Sue Murray were cast in the series.

Filming 
Principal photography began in Sudbury and Cambridge, Ontario in the end of June 2018. Principal photography wrapped in Toronto, Ontario, Canada in October 2018.

Releases

Anthology series 
There have been four anthologies, edited by Jonathan Maberry and published by IDW Publishing, in the V Wars series. Notable authors who contributed short stories to the series include Maberry, Jennifer Brozek, Larry Correia, Keith R. A. DeCandido, John Everson, Gregory Frost, Nancy Holder, Jeff Mariotte, Joe McKinney, James A. Moore, Yvonne Navarro, Scott Nicholson, Weston Ochse, Jeremy Robinson, Scott Sigler, John Skipp, and Tim Waggoner. 
V Wars (May 2012)
V Wars: Blood and Fire (July 2014)
V Wars: Night Terrors (March 2015)
V Wars: Shockwaves (August 2016)

Comic series 
The V Wars comics series was released in 11 issues by IDW from April 2014 through March 2015. They have been collected in the following volumes:
V Wars: Crimson Queen (October 2014)
V Wars: All of Us Monsters (May 2015)

An omnibus volume containing all 11 issues was also released:
V Wars: The Graphic Novel Collection (May 2019)

TV series 
On November 19, 2019, the official trailer for the series was released by Netflix. The series was released on December 5, 2019.

Reception 

Critical reviews are mixed. On Rotten Tomatoes, the series holds a critic approval rating of 56%, with an average rating of 6.73/10, based on nine reviews. Isaac Feldberg at The Boston Globe enjoyed it, calling it "unabashedly silly...a fun, freaky B-movie stretched out to series’ length". The Sydney Morning Herald reviewer, Brad Newsome, was less kind in calling it a "a frustrating thing" that doesn't deliver on its promises. Andrew Dex at Starburst criticized the weak character development and mix of seemingly-unrelated side characters while also praising the growing strength of the series by the end of the season.

In her review for Film Inquiry, Stephanie Archer stated "the series left much to be desired" and that there was "an immediate disconnect with Dr. Swann, played by Somerhalder". Vincent Schilling of Indian Country Today, on the other hand, praised the casting of Somerhalder and Michael Greyeyes, stating he was "hooked from the beginning". He goes on to say that the "show is a blast". Dustin Rowles at Pajiba described the series as "very low-rent", "poorly written", and "humorless".

Mikel Zorilla of the Spanish-language web magazine Espinof criticized the series' lack of focus, saying it had potential but failed to do anything to stand out. WhatCulture described the series "a thrilling well-paced ride...[and] damn good fun that compels you to keep watching" despite "moments that temporarily draw focus from the plot and leave you scratching your head".

References

External links 

2010s American drama television series
2010s American supernatural television series
2010s American horror television series
2010s American science fiction television series
2019 American television series debuts
2019 American television series endings
American horror fiction television series
American thriller television series
Serial drama television series
Television shows based on comics
IDW Publishing adaptations
English-language Netflix original programming
Television shows filmed in Toronto
Television shows filmed in Greater Sudbury
Vampires in television
Apocalyptic television series
Dark fantasy television series
American action television series
Television shows set in the United States
Dark fantasy web series
Thriller web series
Horror fiction web series